NGC 84 (PGC 3325897) is a star in the Andromeda constellation.  It was recorded on November 14, 1884 by Guillaume Bigourdan. It is situated close to the Celestial equator, making it at least partly visible in the sky, from both hemispheres in certain times of the year. It is usually mistaken with PGC 1384.

NGC 84 is displayed as PGC 1384 in Wikisky.

References

External links 
 

0084
18841114
Discoveries by Guillaume Bigourdan
Andromeda (constellation)